Joanna Dukes is an English actress, perhaps best known as Toni 'Tiddler' Tildesley in Press Gang. She has no further acting credits after Press Gang ended in 1993.

TV
Press Gang
Casualty
C.A.T.S. Eyes
The Box of Delights .... Maria
Behind the Bike Sheds

External links

Year of birth missing (living people)
Living people
English television actresses
Place of birth missing (living people)